The Supreme Court of Arbitration of the Russian Federation (also translated as the High[er] Arbitration Court of the Russian Federation;) was the court of final instance in commercial disputes in Russia.  Additionally, it supervised the work of lower courts of arbitration and gave interpretation of laws and elucidations concerning their implementations, which are compulsory for lower courts. It was replaced by a 30-Judge Economic Collegium that is part of an expanded Russian Supreme Court effective August 8, 2014.

History
Commercial arbitrations in Russia existed long before the October revolution, though their powers were very limited. They were abolished immediately after the revolution. In 1922 the Supreme Arbitration Commission, attached to the Council of Labour and Defense, and oblast' arbitration commissions were created. Their function was to solve disputes between state-owned institutions (including profit-making companies). In 1931 all those commissions were abolished. The newly created State Arbitration of the USSR was to resolve disputes about contracts exchanged between enterprises subordinate to various governmental agencies. The disputes arising within one agency's jurisdiction were not brought to the State Arbitration. Whenever the State Arbitration discovered any violations of law, its duty was to report about it to respective law enforcement offices. Similar state arbitrations were created in republics of the USSR.

In 1960 new State Arbitration attached to the Council of Ministers of the USSR Regulations were adopted by the Council of Ministers of the USSR. It de facto established stare decisis principle, since upper state arbitrations were empowered to give compulsory elucidations to the lower ones.

The position of the State Arbitration underwent crucial changes in 1987. The courts of arbitration became a separate branch of courts not subject to the control of the executive branch.

The Supreme Court of Arbitration of Russia ceased operation on August 6, 2014, in relation to the merger with Supreme Court.

Composition
All judges of the Supreme Court of Arbitration including the Chairman were nominated by the president of Russia and appointed by the Federation Council. In order to become a judge a person had to be at least 35 years old, had legal education and 10 years of experience in legal practice. Only Russian nationals could serve as judges.

The Chairman of the Supreme Court of Arbitration supervised the work of the court. He convened sessions of the Presidium of the Court and plenary sessions, appointed the Court's employees and guided its work,  and represented the Court in governmental offices. The last Chairman of the Court was Anton Ivanov. The Chairman had several deputies.

There were two Boards in the Supreme Court of Arbitration, which supervised decisions of lower courts of arbitration whenever appeal is lodged by a disappointed party. One Board heard cases concerning private law and the other heard cases concerning  public law (for example, if a corporation is charged with tax evasion or files for bankruptcy).

The Presidium of the Supreme Court of Arbitration dealt with appeals on decisions of lower courts of arbitration which hade entered into force. Only the Prosecutor General of Russia, Chairman of the Supreme Court of Arbitration and his deputies could bring an appeal to the Presidium. When a case was heard in the Presidium, execution of the decision of a lower court might be delayed.

On plenary sessions the Court studied judicial practice and gave recommendations regarding applications by lower courts of particular provisions. In fact, lower courts had to apply recommendations of the Supreme Court of Arbitration. The procedural Code of Arbitration provided that the Presidium of the Supreme Court of Arbitration was entitled to reverse a decision of a lower court if it did not follow common judicial practice. Organizational matters were also dealt with on plenary sessions. They had to take place at least twice a year.

List of the Russian Supreme Court of Arbitration Chairmen 
 Veniamin Yakovlev (23 January 1992 — 26 January 2005)
 Anton Ivanov (26 January 2005 — 6 August 2014)

See also
Judiciary of Russia

References

External links
Official website (in Russian)
Official website (in English)
The state of the judiciary in Russia International Commission of Jurists, 2010
Securing justice: The disciplinary system for judges in the Russian Federation International Commission of Jurists, 2012

Government of Russia
Arbitration courts and tribunals
Courts in Russia
2014 disestablishments in Russia
Courts and tribunals disestablished in 2014